Hot Hot Hot is a 2011 Luxembourg-Austrian-Belgian co-production film directed by Beryl Koltz.

Story
Ferdinand, a shy forty-something man works for years for Fish Land, a big aquarium in a leisure complex. One day he is muted to the sauna- and hammam part of the complex, where he has suddenly to face nudity, sensuality and other actually tempting aspects of life...

External links
 
 Presentation at samsa.lu 

2011 films
Luxembourgian comedy-drama films
Austrian comedy-drama films
Belgian comedy-drama films
2010s English-language films